Gai Jatra, also known by its endonym Sa Paru, is a Nepalese festival celebrated mainly in the Kathmandu valley by the Newar people. The festival is celebrated in honour of their immediate relatives who have died during the previous year. Various groups of children dressed up as cows and in other comedic drags are organized throughout various cities. 

It is generally celebrated in the month of Bhadra (August/September). The date is set according to the lunar Nepal Samabat calendar and falls on the first day of the dark fortnight of the month of Gunla.

Origin 
Gai Jatra was started by King Pratap Malla during his reign from 1641 to 1671 AD. His teenage son Chakravartendra Malla died an untimely death and the queen grieved the loss of her son. King Pratap Malla started this tradition to both help ascend his son to the next life and also to cheer the grieving queen and families of those whose loved ones had passed away.

Etymology 
The festival is known as Sa Paru in Nepal Bhasa. In Nepal Bhasa, Sa translates to cow and Paru translate to Pratipada tithi (the first day of the fortnight, according to Hindu calendar system). The festival is called this because it is celebrated on Bhadra māsa śukla pakṣa pratipada tithi and the children dress as cows. It is popularly known as Gai Jatra (lit. cow carnival) in the Nepali language and across other parts of Nepal and the world.

Celebrations 
In the Hindu religion, Gai (Cow) is sacred like a Lakshmi and viewed as a mother. The children of those whose families had passed away would come out to Hanuman Dhoka Palace and the Newar priest performs the prayers for those passed. The children usually wear long skirts and must have a tulle belt around their waist with the ends hanging on both their right and left sides that drag on the ground while walking. It is necessary that they drag because it touches the ground (Earth) for the loved ones who passed away to ascend from Earth to heaven. This is a festival of dragging clothes while walking. The children also wear head dresses that have a cow drawn on them which is important, and they wear a moustache drawn on their faces. The Jatra is supposed to be religious for the Newar community to help loved ones pass from Earth to heaven and also to cheer those who are left behind. The parade of drag is done in the morning by children and in the evening with caricature and stand up comedy by Hanuman Dhoka Dabali for grieving Queen and others.

Since the 1600s, the caricatures and jokes have evolved and also includes political satires to make it more interesting on TV shows, usually the male standup comedians wear female clothes and perform both male and female parts of the play, this is a fun event for the Newar community as well as for all other Nepalese communities.

Gai Jatra in different cities
Gia Jatra is mainly celebrated in the cities of Kathmandu valley—Kathmandu, Patan, and Bhaktapur. The celebrataion of the festival has also spread to other parts of the country which have a significant Newar community.

Kathmandu

Kathmandu is considered to be the main source of this festival because the king who started this festival was from this city. After the show presented to the queen was a success, it became an annual program to present the queen with this festival. As time passed on and as the king and queen died, the festival has been passed on from generation to generation. In Kathmandu, people celebrate it with much happiness and many more programs than those in Patan. The procession goes around the city to different parts of the suburbs and the inner urban areas to present the devotion to their loved ones. The people involved in this profession get small packets with fruits, sweets, oats, and other food items to help them on their tour around the city by many people watching the festival and by their loved ones.

Patan

Patan has a similar kind of following for this festival like that with Kathmandu, but has less involvement of people than that in Kathmandu. People in Lalitpur have another festival similar to Gaijatra called Matiyaa which is followed by Hindus with much more devotion and much more involvement by the people. Thousands of people can be involved in this Matiya. Thus, for people in Lalitpur, the procession of Gaijatra is less entertaining.

Kirtipur
Gaijatra is celebrated widely, and particularly in Kirtipur's ancient historical towns: Kipu, Naga and Panga. The people in who celebrate in Kirtipur have many reasons to celebrate this festival and have a unique way of celebrating this festival. Among the people of Kirtipur, it is said that the gates of heaven for the dead are opened on this day, and the procession of Gaijatra will help their beloved to reach the gates of heaven if they march around the city for them. They march around the city of Kirtipur not by dressing up like cows but rather dressed up in different forms of gods and goddesses. People celebrate this festival not only for their dead relatives but also for peace and harmony among family members and the city itself.

During this month the farmers of the city finish up their work in the fields and return home to celebrate the ending of the hard and tedious work in the fields. They gather family members and have a feast to their success. This culture is replicated in this festival in Kirtipur. Men dress up like women and travel around the city. They go from house to house calling up the owners of the house and asking them to come down and join in the feast with them. This helps to create harmony among the neighbors and the city members.
Kirtipur performs many dances with different imitating artists that provide much awe and happiness among the people. Kirtipur is enriched with many more beliefs and stories relating to Gaijatra than any other cities of the valley, and it has a more diverse celebration of this festival.

Bhaktapur

Bhaktapur is said to have the most enjoyable and exciting Gai Jatra, as it has its own peculiarities in the ways the festival is celebrated as compared to Lalitpur and Kathmandu. A chariot (known as Taha-Macha) made of bamboo wrapped in cloth, with a photo of the deceased person hung at the center, is navigated through a predefined street by the family along with localities. So a long parade of chariots is seen.

The Taha-Macha symbolizes dead people and is decorated with their possessions and photographs. The chariot has a framework of bamboo which is wrapped with cotton cloth, usually Hakupatasi (a black traditional sari type female cloth) for women and simple sari type cloth for men. The Taha-Machas are brought out from different toles of Bhaktapur, but peculiarly, the Taha-Machas of Lakolachhen are guided by one large one that has the bamboo framework but is covered in straws. This is known as Bhailya Dya: (Bhairab) and is succeeded by Ajima (Bhadrakali) made at Khala (Ajima Dyo:Chhen)

Many local musicians, and a cultural dance called Ghintang Ghisi follow in the wake of a chariot.. Men are also seen wearing women's dress, Hakupatasi. People dress up in many ways. There is face painting and masks are common. Children even dress up as gods and join the parade.

The Ghintang Ghisi dance is celebrated for almost a week, starting from the day of Gaijatra to Krishna Janmashtami. The dance is done in a long queue with two persons in a row hitting each other's sticks. Many cultural shows are performed, and the festival is even participated in by many nearby villages.

References

Newar
Observances set by the Vikram Samvat calendar
Observances honoring the dead
August observances
September observances
Hindu festivals in Nepal
Hindu rituals related to death
Animal festival or ritual
Culture of Bagmati